Romoland School District is a TK–8 public school district based in Riverside County, California, United States serving over 4,500 students residing in Romoland, Homeland, Perris, and Menifee. 

Romoland School District has been recognized by Google for Education as a Reference District.

Elementary schools 
Romoland Elementary School
Harvest Valley Elementary School
Boulder Ridge Elementary School
Mesa View Elementary School

Middle school 
Ethan A. Chase Middle School

TK-8 School of Choice 
Hillside Innovation Academy

References

External links
 

School districts in Riverside County, California